Hypsacantha is a genus of African orb-weaver spiders containing the single species, Hypsacantha crucimaculata. It was first described by Friedrich Dahl in 1914, and has only been found in Africa.

References

Araneidae
Monotypic Araneomorphae genera
Spiders of Africa
Taxa named by Friedrich Dahl